Agaricus lilaceps, also known as the cypress agaricus or the giant cypress agaricus is a species of mushroom. It is among the largest and most edible Agaricus species in California. Aside from size, Agaricus lilaceps is characterized by a robust stature, as the stipe often club-shaped.

Description 
The cap of the mushroom is 8–20 cm broad, convex, and expands to nearly plane. As it ages, the disc sometimes depresses. The margin, however, is incurved, although it decurves at maturity. The surface of the cap is at first pallid to cream-buff, especially when developing below ground, but soon becomes appressed and fibrillose-squamose. In addition, it varies from brown, hazel-brown, dull chestnut-brown, and occasionally lilac-brown, although it darkens as it ages. At times, the surface develops orange-brown, rufescent areas. The context is thick, very firm, white, and slowly turns vinaceous when cut or bruised. The  odor is that of a typical mushroom, although it tastes mild.

The gills of Agaricus lilaceps are free, close, moderately broad, and dingy-pink when young. However, when bruised, it turns reddish-brown slowly, and dark chocolate-brown at maturity.

The stipe is 9–19 cm long, 3–5 cm thick, and equal to clavate. The core of the stem is stuffed, while the surface is dry and white with scattered fibrils at the apex. However, the base is a discoloring dingy brownish-red to ochraceous. Also, the stipe can be smooth to patchy fibrillose below. There is a partial white veil that is membranous, thick, and elastic. The upper surface is wrinkled, while the lower surface is more or less smooth, occasionally cracking and forming patches. Also, the lower surface sometimes yellows in age or when bruised, forming a superior, pendulous annulus at maturity. The stipe gradually becomes blackish from adhering spores.

The spores are 5–6.5 by 4–5 μm, elliptical, and smooth. The spore print is dark-brown.

Habitat 
Agaricus lilaceps are scattered or clustered under Monterey Cypress (Cupressus macrocarpa). They fruit from mid to late winter. They are found exclusively in the central area of California, though A. lilaceps can be found in the west in the Monterey Bay area. In addition, A. lilaceps can  also be found on Stanford University under the eucalyptus.

See also 
 List of Agaricus species

References 

lilaceps
Edible fungi
Fungi described in 1938
Fungi of California